This page represents all time results of Uzbekistan U-23, U-22 and U-21 national football teams.

Results

U-23

2018

2017

2016

2014

2014 Asian Games

2012

2012 Summer Olympics Qualification

2010
2010 Asian Games

 2006 2006 Asian Games

2002
2002 Asian Games

U-22

2017

2015

2014
2013 AFC U-22 Championship

2011

2012 Summer Olympics Qualification

U-21

2012
2013 AFC U-22 Asian Cup qualification

See also
2012 Uzbekistan national football team results

References

External links
Uzbekistan Football Federation

U23